Tanya Tucker's Greatest Hits is the second compilation album by the American country music artist of the same name. It was released on March 13, 1978 via MCA Records.

Track listing

Chart performance

Reference

1978 compilation albums
Tanya Tucker albums
Albums produced by Jerry Crutchfield
Albums produced by Snuff Garrett
MCA Records compilation albums